The lizard pattern (TAP47 pattern or Leopard pattern for the French) is a family of many related designs of military camouflage pattern, first used by the French Army on uniforms from 1947 to the late 1980s. It was based on the British paratroopers' Denison smock. The use of the pattern is widespread in Africa, despite its association with France, because armed factions and militaries tend to obtain them from whichever source has it available.

There are two major types of lizard pattern, horizontal like the original French design, and vertical like the early variant developed by Portugal. In addition, the Vietnam War tigerstripe pattern is descended from Lizard.

Evolution of lizard patterns

Lizard patterns have two overlapping prints, generally green and brown, printed with gaps so that a third dyed color, such as a lighter green or khaki, makes up a large part of the pattern. In this, it is printed like earlier British patterns used on that country's Paratroopers Denison smocks. Lizard patterns have narrower printed areas than the British patterns, and the original form had a strong horizontal orientation, disrupting the vertical form of the soldier's body.

Horizontal lizard patterns

Horizontal lizard patterns in different colour forms were made by the French. A copy of the French pattern, made in Asia, was adopted by some African countries such as Chad, Gabon, Rwanda, and Sudan. In around 1970 Cuba designed a gray variety, used by Cuba and by the FAPLA of Angola. Greece has used a range of horizontal lizard patterns from the 1960s. Russian Spetsnaz and interior ministry troops wear horizontal lizard patterns. The Israel Defence Force used actual French lizard uniforms (donated by France) until 1968, alongside plain (unpatterned) battledress.

Bulgarian Army used the surplus Israel Defence Force uniforms as official uniform in United Nation's mission in Cambodia (UNTAC), 1992-1993.

French lizard was among the patterns used in Congo in 1978. After the Algerian War the "Troupes Aéroportée"  (Airborne Troops) "Tenue Leopard"/"tenues de saut" was officially withdrawn from French service in January 1963 as it was felt to be a reminder of the Paratroops mutiny. It was initially replaced with the olive green M1947 "trellis/tenue de compagne" and later the newer green "trellis Satin M1964" in 1971 which became the "tenue F-1", the forest camouflage CCE was introduced in 1991.

However, the "tenue camouflee toutes armes" variant was worn by the entire Foreign Legion throughout the 1960s  and by Foreign Legion paratroops into the early 1980s until finally replaced by the “tenue F1”.

Vertical lizard patterns
Vertical lizard patterns in different colorways were apparently developed in Portugal from the original French horizontal patterns. The lizard pattern had been in use in Portugal since 1956 with the Air Force's Paratroopers, being extended to the Army's Special Rifles units in 1960. With the Portuguese Military engaged in the Overseas Wars mainly fought in the African jungles, the camouflaged uniform was issued throughout the whole Army and some units of the Navy and Air Force. In 1963, a vertical lizard pattern was developed, this replacing the French horizontal pattern. Paradoxically, the Portuguese vertical lizard pattern become popular amongst some of the guerrillas that opposed Portugal in the Overseas Wars and was later adopted by the armed forces of some of the former Portuguese African colonies after their independence.

The Portuguese vertical lizard pattern was adopted by Brazil, which developed a range of colorways for each of its armed services. Egypt, Greece, India, Lebanese Palestinians and Syria have all used variants of the vertical lizard pattern. SWAPO guerrillas in Namibia wore a wide variety of camouflage, including Portuguese lizard.

Other descendants

The Vietnam War tigerstripe is descended from Lizard. It began as a French experimental pattern during the Indochina war. It was based on the TAP47 lizard pattern, and was adopted by the South Vietnamese Marines. Tigerstripe differed from lizard in having its printed areas interlocked rather than overlapped; it also used smaller areas of dyed background color.

Users

Current
 : Grey Lizard camos used by Algerian paratroopers. Purple-dominant lizard used in the 1980s.
 : Greek Lizard camos used by Armenian troops while in peacekeeping operations under NATO command.
 : Known to be used by Bahraini commando units.
 
 : Used by the Brazilian military.
 : Brazilian variant used by Cape Verdean military units in public function roles and by Cape Verdean Naval Infantry. Regular lizard pattern used by rest of Cape Verdean military.
 : Digital version of the lizard camo used by the East Timorese military.
 
 
 
 : Uses clones of French Lizard camo used by the Syrian military.

Former
 : Used Cuban-made lizard camos. UNITA used French-based lizard camos.
  Used as official uniform in UNTAC mission (Cambodia 1992-1993)
 : Formerly used Cuban-made lizard camos, derived from Soviet camo designs.
 : Some members of the volunteer old-age men Corp (εθνοφύλακες) of the Cypriot National Guard still use it.
 : Widely used by French military forces in Vietnam and Algeria.
 : Used in the 1960s, supplied by France.
 
 : Used to have Portuguese lizard camos by Portuguese forces fighting in Africa.
 : The Rhodesian SAS wore the Portuguese lizard camo.
 :
 : Spetsnaz advisors to FAPLA wore Cuban-made lizard camos.
 : Formerly used by Yugoslav Police from 1992 to 2001.

Non-state actors
 FAPLA: Used Cuban lizard camos.
 SWAPO: Used Portuguese lizard camos.
 ZANLA: Used Portuguese lizard camouflage.
 ZIPRA: Used Portuguese lizard camouflage.

References

Sources

 
 
 
 

Camouflage patterns
Military camouflage
Military equipment introduced from 1945 to 1949